Ion Barbu (born 14 May 1977 in Scorniceşti, Olt County) is a Romanian former professional footballer and currently a manager.

External links 
 

1977 births
Living people
People from Scornicești
Romanian footballers
FCV Farul Constanța players
FC Politehnica Iași (1945) players
Association football defenders
Liga I players
Liga II players
Romanian football managers
FCV Farul Constanța managers